Fatemeh Geraeli Sheikh (born 30 January 1999),  known as Fatemeh Geraeli, is an Iranian footballer who plays as a midfielder for Kowsar Women Football League club Bam Khatoon F.C. She has been a member of the senior Iran women's national team.

International goals

References 

1999 births
Living people
Iranian women's footballers
Iran women's international footballers
Women's association football midfielders
People from Qaem Shahr
Sportspeople from Mazandaran province